Sérgio Manoel is a name. People with that name include:
 Sérgio Manoel (footballer, born 1972)
 Sérgio Manoel (footballer, born 1989)